Mikaele Tuugahala (b.  in Wallis and Futuna) is a French rugby union player. He plays at the Prop position and currently plays for Racing Métro 92. He is the cousin of Toulon Loose forward Jocelino Suta.

Career
Tuugahala started playing rugby in 1998 for Paita SA in New Caledonia. From 2001 to 2007 he played for Stade Montois. In 2007 he moved to Racing Métro 92 where he currently plays.

References

External links
ESPN Profile
Racing Métro 92 Player Profile (French)

French rugby union players
Rugby union players from Wallis and Futuna
Rugby union props
1976 births
Living people